Lipy may refer to the following places:
Lipy, Lubusz Voivodeship (west Poland)
Lipy, Pomeranian Voivodeship (north Poland)
Lipy, Świętokrzyskie Voivodeship (south-central Poland)